William Soutar (28 April 1898 – 15 October 1943) was a Scottish poet and diarist who wrote in English and in Braid Scots. He is known best for his epigrams.

Life and works
William Soutar was born on 28 April 1898 on South Inch Terrace in Perth, Scotland, the only child of John Soutar (1871–1958), master joiner, and his wife, Margaret Smith (1870–1954), who wrote poetry. His parents belonged to the United Free Church of Scotland. He was educated at Southern District School, Perth, and at Perth Academy, before joining the wartime Royal Navy in 1916. By the time he was demobilized in November 1918, he was suffering from what would be diagnosed in 1924 as ankylosing spondylitis, a form of chronic inflammatory arthritis.

Soutar began to study medicine at the University of Edinburgh in 1919, but switched to English. He did not excel academically, but began to contribute to the student magazine. His first volume, Gleanings by an Undergraduate (1923), appeared at his father's expense, as did several others. He began to keep a diary on 18 April 1919. During that period he made contact with Hugh MacDiarmid, then in Montrose, and with Ezra Pound. MacDiarmid at the time was abandoning poetry in English in favour of "synthetic Scots", a literary language compiled from dialects and earlier writers such as Robert Henryson and William Dunbar.

Soutar's work correspondingly altered radically, and he became a leading figure of the Scottish Literary Renaissance, whom posthumous editors would dub "one of the greatest poets Scotland has produced." His family adopted an orphaned cousin of his, seven-year-old Evelyn, in 1927, and this became a spur to him to write also for children. Seeds in the Wind (1933) was a volume of "bairn-rhymes" in Scots.

By 1930 Soutar was bedridden with his disease. He died in 1943 of tuberculosis contracted in 1929. He is buried in Perth's Jeanfield and Wellshill Cemetery. His collected poems, edited by MacDiarmid, were published in 1948. His journal, The Diary of a Dying Man, appeared posthumously. One form of verse he used was the cinquain (now known as American cinquains), which he preferred to call epigrams. Interest in Soutar's work in Scots and English and for adults and children, has revived considerably since the 1980s, although none of his verse was in print for his centenary in 1998. In 2014 he was the subject of a BBC radio programme: The Still Life Poet by Liz Lochhead.

Musical settings
Benjamin Britten set twelve Soutar poems for tenor voice and piano in the 1969 song cycle Who Are These Children? (op. 84). Erik Chisholm set a range of Soutar's verse, including Summer Song, A Dirge for Summer, and the humorous settings The Prodigy, The Braw Plum and The Three Worthies.

James MacMillan set several Soutar's Scots-language poems in a style that drew on traditional folk song: "Scots Song" (aka 'The Tryst', 1991), "Ballad" (1994) and "The Children" (1995) were collected as Three Scottish Songs in 1995. The album In a Sma' Room, with settings by Debra Salem, Kevin Mackenzie and Paul Harrison, appeared in 2021.

Selected published works
Gleanings by an Undergraduate (Paisley: Alexander Gardner, 1923)
Brief Words. One Hundred Epigrams (Edinburgh/London: The Moray Press, 1935)
Seeds in the Wind, Poems in Scots for Children (London: Andrew Dakers, 1943)
Diaries of a Dying Man (Edinburgh: Canongate Press, 1954) . In fact only a short selection
The Collected Poems of William Soutar, ed. Hugh MacDiarmid (London: Andrew Dakers, 1948)
Poems of William Soutar: a New Selection, ed. W. R. Aitken (Edinburgh: Scottish Academic Press, 1988) 
The Diary of a Dying Man (Edinburgh: Chapman, 1991) 
At the Year's Fa': Selected Poems in Scots and English (Perth: Perth & Kinross Libraries, 2001)

External resources
The Scottish Poetry Library site includes a handful of Soutar's poems: Retrieved 16 August 2013. More can be found in Retrieved 16 August 2013 and Retrieved 16 August 2013.
A sample of Soutar's cinquains.

References

External links
William Soutar Perth Walks – Perth and Kinross Council

1898 births
1943 deaths
20th-century deaths from tuberculosis
Lallans poets
Scots Makars
Writers from Perth, Scotland
People educated at Perth Academy
20th-century Scottish poets
Scottish male poets
Alumni of the University of Edinburgh
20th-century British male writers
Scottish Renaissance
Royal Navy personnel of World War I
Tuberculosis deaths in Scotland